Ádám Weitner (born 9 September 1982 in Pécs) is a Hungarian football player who currently plays for Paksi SE.

References 
Player Profile at HLSZ
European Football Clubs & Squads

1982 births
Living people
Sportspeople from Pécs
Hungarian footballers
Association football forwards
Győri ETO FC players
Vasas SC players
Gyirmót FC Győr players
FC Felcsút players
Paksi FC players
FC Tatabánya players
Nemzeti Bajnokság I players
21st-century Hungarian people